"The Day We Caught the Train" is a song by British rock band Ocean Colour Scene. The song was released on 3 June 1996 as the third single from their second studio album, Moseley Shoals (1996), and reached number four on the UK Singles Chart, achieving platinum status for sales and streams exceeding 600,000. The single was also released as an acoustic alternative on a second CD, with additional B-sides, one of which "Justine" is a re-recording and had originally appeared on their self-titled debut album.

Track listings

UK CD1
 "The Day We Caught the Train" – 3:10
 "The Clock Struck 15 Hours Ago" – 3:05
 "I Need a Love Song" – 2:08
 "Chicken Bones and Stones" – 3:34

UK CD2
 "The Day We Caught the Train" (acoustic version) – 3:20
 "Travellers Tune" – 3:43
 "Justine" – 3:16

UK cassette single
 "The Day We Caught the Train"
 "The Clock Struck 15 Hours Ago"

Australian CD single
 "The Day We Caught the Train" – 3:10
 "The Clock Struck 15 Hours Ago" – 3:05
 "I Need a Love Song" – 2:08
 "Chicken Bones and Stones" – 3:34
 "The Day We Caught the Train" (acoustic version) – 3:10

Credits and personnel
Credits are taken from the Moseley Shoals album booklet.

Studio
 Recorded and mixed at Moseley Shoals (Birmingham, England)
 Mastered at the Powerplant (London, England)

Personnel

 Ocean Colour Scene – writing, production
 Simon Fowler – vocals, acoustic guitar
 Steve Cradock – guitar, piano, vocals
 Oscar Harrison – drums, piano, vocals
 Damon Minchella – bass guitar
 Brendan Lynch – production
 Martin Heyes – engineering
 Tony Keach – assistant engineering
 Tim Young – mastering

Charts

Weekly charts

Year-end charts

Certifications

Release history

See also
 List of train songs

References

External links
 OCS single details

1996 singles
1996 songs
MCA Records singles
Ocean Colour Scene songs
Songs written by Damon Minchella
Songs written by Oscar Harrison
Songs written by Simon Fowler
Songs written by Steve Cradock